The Crimson City (1928) is an American silent drama film produced by Warner Bros. written by Anthony Coldeway and directed by Archie Mayo. Actors include Myrna Loy, Anna May Wong, Sōjin Kamiyama, John Miljan, Leila Hyams  and Richard Tucker. The film was released with a Vitaphone soundtrack with a music score and sound effects. The film was released by Warner Brothers Pictures on April 7, 1928.

Plot
The story centers on an Asian woman named Onoto (Loy), who is rescued from slavery by a fugitive of European ancestry named Gregory Kent (Miljan). They fall in love, but prevailing mores about race doom the romance. Onoto leaves Kent so that he may marry another (Hyams).

Cast
Myrna Loy as Onoto
John Miljan as Gregory Kent
Leila Hyams as Nadine Howells
Matthew Betz as "Dagger Foo"
Anders Randolf as Major Howells
Sōjin Kamiyama as Sin Yoy
Anna May Wong as Su
Richard Tucker as Richard Brand

Preservation status
The only known surviving copy is kept at the Museo del Cine Pablo Ducros Hicken in Buenos Aires, Argentina. A trailer for this film survives among the holdings of the Library of Congress.

References

External links

lantern slide plate of the film
lobby poster

1928 films
1920s English-language films
American silent feature films
American black-and-white films
Films directed by Archie Mayo
Warner Bros. films
Silent American drama films
1920s rediscovered films
1928 drama films
Rediscovered American films
1920s American films